Uropodidae is a family of mites in the order Mesostigmata.

Description 
As part of superfamily Uropodoidea, Uropodidae are tortoise-like mites with an oval to circular outline, and with armour both dorsally and ventrally. They can be distinguished from other uropodoids by their chelicerae lacking a large, sclerotized node and their genital opening being in an intercoxal position.

Ecology 
Several species in the family commonly infest worm bins and consume food intended for the worms.

An undescribed species of Uropodidae sucks out the hemolymph of pupae of Pheidole megacephala ants, resulting in the death of pupae. It preferentially attacks pupae of soldier and male ants.

Uropodidae are phoretic on larger arthropods, meaning that they attach to larger arthropods to be transported to new places. This attachment is achieved using a pedicel of translucent material extruded from the mite's anus. One known host for uropodid mites is the red palm weevil (Rhynchophorus ferrugineus), though this particular relationship may actually be parasitic, as mite-infested weevils have a shorter lifespan than uninfested weevils.

Species

 Allocircocylliba J. F. Marais & G. C. Loots, 1981
 Allocircocylliba machadoi J. F. Marais & G. C. Loots, 1981
 Antennequesoma Sellnick, 1926
 Antennequesoma labergei Elzinga, 1982
 Antennequesoma longissima Elzinga, 1982
 Antennequesoma lujai Sellnick, 1926
 Antennequesoma reichenspergeri Sellnick, 1926
 Antennequesoma rettenmeyeri Elzinga, 1982
 Antennequesoma tenuatum Elzinga, 1982
 Baloghibrasiluropoda Hirschmann, 1973
 Baloghibrasiluropoda foveatoides Hirschmann, 1973
 Baloghibrasiluropoda foveolata Hirschmann, 1973
 Baloghibrasiluropoda foveolatasimilis Hirschmann, 1973
 Baloghjkaszabia baloghi Hirschmann, 1973
 Baloghjkaszabia baloghisimilis Hirschmann, 1973
 Baloghjkaszabia baloghoides Hirschmann, 1973
 Brasiluropoda Hirschmann & Zirngiebl-Nicol, 1964
 Brasiluropoda andrassyi Zirngiebl-Nicol & Hirschmann, 1975
 Brasiluropoda baloghi Zirngiebl-Nicol & Hirschmann, 1975
 Brasiluropoda brasiliensis Hirschmann, 1977
 Brasiluropoda eustructura Hirschmann & Zirngiebl-Nicol, 1969
 Brasiluropoda kaszabi Zirngiebl-Nicol & Hirschmann, 1975
 Brasiluropoda lindquisti Hirschmann, 1977
 Brasiluropoda loksai Zirngiebl-Nicol & Hirschmann, 1975
 Brasiluropoda mahunkai Zirngiebl-Nicol & Hirschmann, 1975
 Brasiluropoda ovalis Hirschmann & Zirngiebl-Nicol, 1969
 Brasiluropoda peruensis Hiramatsu, 1981
 Brasiluropoda schubarti Hirschmann & Zirngiebl-Nicol, 1969
 Brasiluropoda stammeri Hirschmann & Zirngiebl-Nicol, 1969
 Brasiluropoda structura Hirschmann & Zirngiebl-Nicol, 1969
 Brasiluropoda willmanni Hirschmann & Zirngiebl-Nicol, 1969
 Castrichovella J. Wisniewski & W. Hirschmann, 1990
 Castrichovella mesoafricana J. Wisniewski & W. Hirschmann, 1990
 Castriidinychus Hirschmann, 1973
 Castriidinychus anguinus Hirschmann, 1973
 Castriidinychus baloghi Hirschmann, 1975
 Castriidinychus castrii (Hirschmann, 1972)
 Castriidinychus castriisimilis Hirschmann, 1973
 Castriidinychus cribrarius (Berlese, 1888)
 Castriidinychus dentatoides Hirschmann, 1973
 Castriidinychus dentatus (Hirschmann, 1972)
 Castriidinychus dictyoeides Hirschmann, 1973
 Castriidinychus ditrichus (Hirschmann & Zirngiebl-Nicol, 1972)
 Castriidinychus eupunctatosimilis Hirschmann, 1973
 Castriidinychus eupunctatus Hirschmann, 1973
 Castriidinychus flavooides Hirschmann, 1973
 Castriidinychus flavus Hirschmann, 1973
 Castriidinychus kaszabi Hirschmann, 1975
 Castriidinychus maeandralis Hirschmann, 1973
 Castriidinychus mahunkai Hirschmann, 1975
 Castriidinychus marginalis (Hirschmann & Zirngiebl-Nicol, 1972)
 Castriidinychus paucistructurus Hirschmann, 1973)
 Castriidinychus similidentatus Hirschmann, 1973
 Castriidinychus topali Hirschmann, 1973)
 Castrinenteria Hirschmann, 1979
 Castrinenteria castrii (Hirschmann, 1972)
 Castrinenteria loksai (Hirschmann, 1972)
 Centrouropoda Berlese, 1916
 Centrouropoda almerodai Hiramatsu & Hirschmann, in Wisniewski, Hirschmann & Hiramatsu 1992
 Centrouropoda brasiliana Wisniewski & Hirschmann, 1992
 Centrouropoda daelei Hirschmann, 1981
 Centrouropoda pelekymorpha Hirschmann & Wisniewski, in Wisniewski, Hirschmann & Hiramatsu 1992
 Centrouropoda peruana Wisniewski & Hirschmann, 1992
 Centrouropoda rackae Hirschmann, 1975
 Centrouropoda rhombogyna (Berlese, 1916)
 Centrouropoda securiformis Wisniewski & Hirschmann, in Wisniewski, Hirschmann & Hiramatsu 1992
 Centrouropoda solmani Wisniewski & Hirschmann, in Wisniewski, Hirschmann & Hiramatsu 1992
 Cilliba von Heyden, 1826
 Cilliba angolaensis Marais, 1981
 Cilliba antennurelloides Lombardini, 1943
 Cilliba athiasae (Hirschmann & Zirngiebl-Nicol, 1969)
 Cilliba australis (Hutu, 1987)
 Cilliba bordagei (Berlese, 1916)
 Cilliba cassidea (Hermann, 1804)
 Cilliba cassideasimuis Bloszyk, 1984
 Cilliba cassidoidea (Hirschmann & Zirngiebl-Nicol, 1969)
 Cilliba circularis Trägårdh, 1931
 Cilliba erlangensis (Hirschmann & Zirngiebl-Nicol, 1969)
 Cilliba foroliviensis Lombardini, 1961
 Cilliba franzi (Hirschmann & Zirngiebl-Nicol, 1969)
 Cilliba insularis Willmann, 1938
 Cilliba machadoi Marais, 1981
 Cilliba massanae Athias-Binche, 1980
 Cilliba punctumgenitalis Marais, 1981
 Cilliba rafalski Bloszyk, 1984
 Cilliba sellnicki (Hirschmann & Zirngiebl-Nicol, 1969)
 Cilliba sopronensis (Wisniewski & Hirschmann, 1990)
 Cilliba stammeri (Hirschmann & Zirngiebl-Nicol, 1969)
 Cilliba tripliciterscutata Lombardini, 1943
 Cilliba woelkei (Hirschmann & Zirngiebl-Nicol, 1969)
 Congouropoda Hirschmann & Hiramatsu, 1977
 Congouropoda johnstoni Hirschmann & Hiramatsu, 1977
 Coxequesoma Sellnick, 1926
 Coxequesoma cauda (Elzinga, 1989)
 Coxequesoma collegianorum Sellnick, 1926
 Coxequesoma gignodissidens Elzinga, 1982
 Coxequesoma hermanni Elzinga, 1982
 Coxequesoma labidocoxata Elzinga, 1982
 Coxequesoma panamaensis (Hirschmann, 1975)
 Cyclacarus Ewing, 1933
 Cyclacarus aberrans Ewing, 1933
 Elegansovella W. Hirschmann, 1989
 Elegansovella elegans (G. Canestrini, 1897)
 Eucylliba Berlese, 1917
 Eucylliba bordagei (Oudemans, 1912)
 Hildaehirschmannia Wisniewski, 1995
 Hildaehirschmannia coleopterophila Wisniewski, 1995
 Hutufeideria Hirschmann & Hiramatsu, 1977
 Hutufeideria aokii Hiramatsu, 1979
 Hutufeideria deliciosa Hiramatsu, 1978
 Hutufeideria feideri Hirschmann & Hiramatsu, 1977
 Hutufeideria feiderisimilis Hiramatsu, 1981
 Hutufeideria haradai Hiramatsu, 1983
 Hutufeideria hirschmanni Hiramatsu, 1978
 Hutufeideria hirschmannisimilis Hiramatsu, 1980
 Hutufeideria hutuae Hirschmann & Hiramatsu, 1977
 Hutufeideria virtuosa Hiramatsu, 1983
 Jerzywisniewskia Hirschmann, 1979
 Jerzywisniewskia alwini (Wisniewski, 1979)
 Jerzywisniewskia depilata (Trouessart, 1902)
 Jerzywisniewskia depilatasimilis (Wisniewski, 1979)
 Jerzywisniewskia fiedleri (Wisniewski, 1979)
 Jerzywisniewskia treati (Hirschmann, 1980)
 Kaszabjbaloghia Hirschmann, 1973
 Kaszabjbaloghia hirschmanni Hiramatsu, 1978
 Kaszabjbaloghia kaszabi Hirschmann, 1973
 Kaszabjbaloghia kaszabisimilis Hirschmann, 1973
 Kaszabjbaloghia mahunkai Hirschmann, 1973
 Kaszabjbaloghia mahunkaisimilis Hirschmann, 1973
 Kaszabjbaloghia zicsii Hirschmann, 1973
 Multidenturopoda J. Wisniewski & W. Hirschmann, 1991
 Multidenturopoda camerunis J. Wisniewski & W. Hirschmann, 1991
 Nobuohiramatsuia W. Hirschmann, 1990
 Nobuohiramatsuia crassa (Hiramatsu, 1979)
 Nobuohiramatsuia fortis (Hiramatsu & Hirschmann, 1983)
 Odonturopoda Marais, 1977
 Odonturopoda knysnaensis Marais, 1977
 Planodiscus Sellnick, 1926
 Planodiscus borgmeieri Elzinga, 1990
 Planodiscus burchelli Elzinga & Rettenmeyer, 1966
 Planodiscus capillilatus Elzinga, 1991
 Planodiscus cupiens Elzinga & Rettenmeyer, 1970
 Planodiscus elongatus Elzinga & Rettenmeyer, 1970
 Planodiscus elzingai (Hirsohmann, 1973)
 Planodiscus foreli Elzinga & Rettenmeyer, 1970
 Planodiscus furcatus Ramadan, 1997
 Planodiscus hamatus Elzinga & Rettenmeyer, 1970
 Planodiscus hirsuta (Banks, 1902)
 Planodiscus kistneri Elzinga, 1991
 Planodiscus mexicanus Elzinga, 1990
 Planodiscus setosus Elzinga & Rettenmeyer, 1970
 Planodiscus squamatim Sellnick, 1926
 Pseudouropoda Oudemans, 1936
 Pseudouropoda vegetans (DeGeer, 1768)
 Rotundabaloghia Hirschmann, 1975
 Rotundabaloghia africaguttaseta Hirschmann, 1984
 Rotundabaloghia africana Hirschmann, 1992
 Rotundabaloghia altoensis Hirschmann, 1992
 Rotundabaloghia amazonasae Hirschmann, 1992
 Rotundabaloghia angulogynella Hirschmann, 1975
 Rotundabaloghia angustigynella Hirschmann, 1975
 Rotundabaloghia aokii Hiramatsu, 1979
 Rotundabaloghia auriculata Hirschmann, in Hirschmann & Hiramatsu 1992
 Rotundabaloghia australibaloghia Hiramatsu & Hirschmann, 1978
 Rotundabaloghia australis Hirschmann, 1992
 Rotundabaloghia baczaensis Hirschmann, 1992
 Rotundabaloghia baloghi Hirschmann, 1975
 Rotundabaloghia baloghioides Hirschmann, 1975
 Rotundabaloghia baloghisimilis Hirschmann, 1975
 Rotundabaloghia belemensis Hirschmann, 1992
 Rotundabaloghia boliviensis Hirschmann, 1992
 Rotundabaloghia bosqueensis Hirschmann, 1992
 Rotundabaloghia bueaensis Hirschmann, 1992
 Rotundabaloghia cajamarcae Hirschmann, 1992
 Rotundabaloghia camerunis Hirschmann, 1984
 Rotundabaloghia campanellae Hirschmann, 1992
 Rotundabaloghia campanellasimilis Hirschmann, 1992
 Rotundabaloghia chingazaensis Hirschmann, 1992
 Rotundabaloghia chisacaensis Hirschmann, 1992
 Rotundabaloghia congoensis Hirschmann, 1992
 Rotundabaloghia coroicoensis Hirschmann, 1981
 Rotundabaloghia cuyi Hiramatsu & Hirschmann, in Hirschmann & Hiramatsu 1992
 Rotundabaloghia daelei Hirschmann, 1984
 Rotundabaloghia diclavata Hirschmann, 1992
 Rotundabaloghia dodomae Hirschmann, 1992
 Rotundabaloghia duodecimsetae Hirschmann, 1992
 Rotundabaloghia duodecimtricha Hirschmann, 1992
 Rotundabaloghia duodecimventralis Hirschmann, 1992
 Rotundabaloghia ecuadorensis Hirschmann, 1992
 Rotundabaloghia endroedyi Hirschmann, 1992
 Rotundabaloghia fincae Hirschmann, 1992
 Rotundabaloghia flava Hirschmann, 1992
 Rotundabaloghia foraminosa Hiramatsu, 1983
 Rotundabaloghia forcipata Hirschmann, 1992
 Rotundabaloghia garciai Hiramatsu & Hirschmann, in Hirschmann & Hiramatsu 1992
 Rotundabaloghia ghanaensis Hirschmann, 1992
 Rotundabaloghia guatemalae Hirschmann, 1992
 Rotundabaloghia guerreroensis Hirschmann, 1992
 Rotundabaloghia guttaseta (Hirschmann & Zirngiebl-Nicol, 1972)
 Rotundabaloghia haradai Hiramatsu, 1983
 Rotundabaloghia haradaisimilis Hiramatsu & Hirschmann, in Hirschmann & Hiramatsu 1992
 Rotundabaloghia heterochaeta Hutu, 1978
 Rotundabaloghia heterospinosa Hirschmann, 1975
 Rotundabaloghia hexaspinosa Hirschmann, 1992
 Rotundabaloghia hexaunguiseta Hirschmann, 1992
 Rotundabaloghia hirschmanni Hiramatsu, 1977
 Rotundabaloghia huallagae Hirschmann, 1992
 Rotundabaloghia huilae Hirschmann, 1992
 Rotundabaloghia humicola Hirschmann, 1992
 Rotundabaloghia incisa Hirschmann, 1992
 Rotundabaloghia incisasimilis Hirschmann, 1992
 Rotundabaloghia iquitosensis Hirschmann, 1992
 Rotundabaloghia iquitosensoides Hirschmann, 1992
 Rotundabaloghia kaszabi Hirschmann, 1975
 Rotundabaloghia kaszabisimilis Hirschmann, 1975
 Rotundabaloghia kimbozae Hirschmann, 1992
 Rotundabaloghia kintampoensis Hirschmann, 1992
 Rotundabaloghia lamellosa Hirschmann, 1992
 Rotundabaloghia latibaloghia Hirschmann, 1975
 Rotundabaloghia latigynella Hirschmann, 1975
 Rotundabaloghia leteciae Hirschmann, 1992
 Rotundabaloghia leteciasimilis Hirschmann, 1992
 Rotundabaloghia levigata Hiramatsu, 1983
 Rotundabaloghia limae Hirschmann, 1992
 Rotundabaloghia lindqvisti Hirschmann, 1992
 Rotundabaloghia linguaeformis Hirschmann, 1992
 Rotundabaloghia lupangae Hirschmann, 1992
 Rotundabaloghia luzonensis Hiramatsu & Hirschmann, in Hirschmann & Hiramatsu 1992
 Rotundabaloghia macroseta Hirschmann, 1975
 Rotundabaloghia maculosa Hirschmann, 1992
 Rotundabaloghia maculosoides Hirschmann, 1992
 Rotundabaloghia magna Hirschmann, 1992
 Rotundabaloghia magnafoveolata Hirschmann, 1992
 Rotundabaloghia magnioperculi Hirschmann, 1992
 Rotundabaloghia mahunkai Hirschmann, 1975
 Rotundabaloghia makilingensis Hiramatsu & Hirschmann, in Hirschmann & Hiramatsu 1992
 Rotundabaloghia makilingoides Hirschmann, in Hirschmann & Hiramatsu 1992
 Rotundabaloghia manausensis Hirschmann, 1992
 Rotundabaloghia maranonensis Hirschmann, 1992
 Rotundabaloghia masoumbouensis Hirschmann, 1992
 Rotundabaloghia meruensis Hirschmann, 1992
 Rotundabaloghia monomacroseta Hirschmann, 1975
 Rotundabaloghia monserratensis Hirschmann, 1992
 Rotundabaloghia monterredondoensis Hirschmann, 1992
 Rotundabaloghia moyobambae Hirschmann, 1992
 Rotundabaloghia nguruensis Hirschmann, 1992
 Rotundabaloghia octospinosa Hirschmann, 1992
 Rotundabaloghia ovaligynella Hirschmann, 1992
 Rotundabaloghia pajonalis Hirschmann, 1992
 Rotundabaloghia perstructura Hirschmann, 1984
 Rotundabaloghia peruensis Hirschmann, 1992
 Rotundabaloghia picchuensis Hirschmann, 1992
 Rotundabaloghia pilosa Hirschmann, 1975
 Rotundabaloghia pituitosa Hirschmann, 1992
 Rotundabaloghia pocsi Hirschmann, 1992
 Rotundabaloghia polygonalis Hirschmann, in Hirschmann & Hiramatsu 1992
 Rotundabaloghia portaligynella Hirschmann, 1975
 Rotundabaloghia pucallpae Hirschmann, 1992
 Rotundabaloghia pyrigynella Hirschmann, in Hirschmann & Hiramatsu 1992
 Rotundabaloghia quitoensis Hirschmann, 1992
 Rotundabaloghia rarosi Hiramatsu & Hirschmann, in Hirschmann & Hiramatsu 1992
 Rotundabaloghia resinae Hirschmann, 1992
 Rotundabaloghia reticulata Hiramatsu, 1983
 Rotundabaloghia rotunda (Hirschmann, 1973)
 Rotundabaloghia rwandae Hirschmann, 1984
 Rotundabaloghia sexspinosa Hirschmann, 1992
 Rotundabaloghia silvacola Hirschmann, 1992
 Rotundabaloghia soliformis Hirschmann, 1992
 Rotundabaloghia soliformoides Hirschmann, 1992
 Rotundabaloghia sturmi Hirschmann, 1984
 Rotundabaloghia taguae Hirschmann, 1992
 Rotundabaloghia tanzaniae Hirschmann, 1992
 Rotundabaloghia tenera Hiramatsu, 1983
 Rotundabaloghia tetraclavata Hirschmann, 1992
 Rotundabaloghia tetraunguiseta Hirschmann, 1992
 Rotundabaloghia ucayali Hirschmann, 1992
 Rotundabaloghia ukoguruensis Hirschmann, 1992
 Rotundabaloghia uluguruensis Hirschmann, 1992
 Rotundabaloghia uncinata (Hirschmann & Zirngiebl-Nicol, 1962)
 Rotundabaloghia unguiseta (Hirschmann & Zirngiebl-Nicol, 1972)
 Rotundabaloghia venezuelae Hirschmann, 1992
 Rotundabaloghia vonalis Hirschmann, 1992
 Rotundabaloghia woelkei Hirschmann, 1981
 Rotundabaloghia zicsii Hirschmann, 1975
 Tetrasejaspis Sellnick, 1941
 Tetrasejaspis baloghi Hirschmann, 1973
 Tetrasejaspis baloghisimilis Hirschmann, 1973
 Tetrasejaspis carlosbordoni Hutu, 1991
 Tetrasejaspis decui Hutu, 1991
 Tetrasejaspis dinychoides Sellnick, 1941
 Tetrasejaspis eustructura Hirschmann, 1973
 Tetrasejaspis kaszabi Hirschmann, 1973
 Tetrasejaspis mahunkai Hirschmann, 1973
 Tetrasejaspis sellnicki Hirschmann, 1973
 Tetrasejaspis serrata Hirschmann, 1973
 Tetrasejaspis zicsii Hirschmann, 1973
 Trichocylliba Berlese, 1903
 Trichocylliba ablesi Hirschmann, 1973
 Trichocylliba agnesae Elzinga, 1995
 Trichocylliba aguaboae Hirschmann, 1992
 Trichocylliba baloghi Hirschmann, 1973
 Trichocylliba boveni Wisniewski & Hirschmann, 1983
 Trichocylliba brachychaeta (Elzinga & Rettenmeyer, 1975)
 Trichocylliba castrii Hirschmann, 1973
 Trichocylliba chiapensis Elzinga, 1981
 Trichocylliba comata (Leonardi, 1895)
 Trichocylliba crinita (Elzinga & Rettenmeyer, 1975)
 Trichocylliba ecitonis (Elzinga & Rettenmeyer, 1975)
 Trichocylliba ecuadorensis (Elzinga & Rettenmeyer, 1975)
 Trichocylliba elongata Elzinga & Rettenmeyer, 1970
 Trichocylliba galea Elzinga, 1995
 Trichocylliba gibbata Elzinga, 1995
 Trichocylliba hirticoma (Berlese, 1903)
 Trichocylliba kaszabi Hirschmann, 1973
 Trichocylliba krantzi Hirschmann, 1975
 Trichocylliba mahunkai Hirschmann, 1973
 Trichocylliba minuta (Elzinga & Rettenmeyer, 1975)
 Trichocylliba morosa Elzinga, 1995
 Trichocylliba napoensis Elzinga, 1981
 Trichocylliba neili Elzinga, 1995
 Trichocylliba oligochaeta (Elzinga & Rettenmeyer, 1975)
 Trichocylliba panamaensis Hirschmann, 1975
 Trichocylliba praedator Elzinga, 1981
 Trichocylliba schneirlai Elzinga, 1981
 Trichocylliba suctorpoda Elzinga, 1981
 Trichocylliba tumba Elzinga, 1995
 Trichocylliba umbocauda (Elzinga, 1982)
 Trichocylliba watkinsi Elzinga, 1981
 Trichocylliba weberi (Elzinga & Rettenmeyer, 1975)
 Trichouropodella Hirschmann & Zirngiebl-Nicol, 1972
 Trichouropodella aokii Hiramatsu, 1979
 Trichouropodella baloghi Hirschmann, 1977
 Trichouropodella brasiliensis Hirschmann & Zirngiebl-Nicol, 1972
 Trichouropodella elimata (Berlese, 1888)
 Trichouropodella magna Hirschmann & Zirngiebl-Nicol, 1972
 Trichouropodella minimaseta Hirschmann & Zirngiebl-Nicol, 1972
 Trichouropodella panamaensis Hirschmann & Zirngtebl-Nicol, 1972
 Trichouropodella paraguayensis Hirschmann & Zirngiebl-Nicol, 1972
 Trichouropodella vietnamensis Hirschmann, 1983
 Tuberdinychus Schweizer, 1961
 Tuberdinychus subterranus (Schweizer, 1922)
 Ungulaturopoda W. Hirschmann, 1984
 Ungulaturopoda chilesae (Hirschmann, 1984)
 Ungulaturopoda huilae (Hirschmann, 1984)
 Ungulaturopoda huilaparva (Hirschmann, 1984)
 Ungulaturopoda huilastructura (Hirschmann, 1984)
 Ungulaturopoda longicauliculi (Hiramatsu, 1981)
 Ungulaturopoda ungulata (Hirschmann & Hiramatsu, 1977)
 Ungulaturopoda ungulatasimilis (Hiramatsu & Hirschmann, 1979)
 Urocychellopsis Willman, 1953
 Urocychellopsis similis Willman, 1953
 Urocyciella Berlese, 1913
 Urocyciella parvula (Berlese, 1913)
 Uroplitana Sellnick, 1926
 Uroplitana acinaca Sellnick, 1926
 Uropoda Latreille, 1806
 Uropoda afghanica Wisniewski & Hirschmann, 1996
 Uropoda africana (Vitzthum, 1925)
 Uropoda alata Hirschmann, 1981
 Uropoda alpina Berlese, 1904
 Uropoda amani Hirschmann, 1973
 Uropoda amanisimilis Wisniewski, 1980
 Uropoda amblyoponae Banks, 1916
 Uropoda americana Wisniewski & Hirschmann, 1996
 Uropoda amplior (Berlese, 1923)
 Uropoda amplus (Hiramatsu & Hirschmann, 1979)
 Uropoda ancorae Hirschmann, 1981
 Uropoda ancoraesimilis Hirschmann, 1981
 Uropoda andrassyi Hirschmann, 1972
 Uropoda anguinea Hirschmann, 1972
 Uropoda aokii Hiramatsu, 1979
 Uropoda argasiformis (Berlese, 1916)
 Uropoda australiensis Hiramatsu & Hirschmann, 1978
 Uropoda australis Hutu, 1987
 Uropoda baloghi Hirschmann & Zirngiebl-Nicol, 1969
 Uropoda berndti Wisniewski, 1984
 Uropoda bifrons Banks, 1916
 Uropoda bilobata Banks, 1916
 Uropoda bistellaris Vitzthum, 1935
 Uropoda boliviensis Hiramatsu & Hirschmann, 1978
 Uropoda brasiliensis (Sellnick, 1962)
 Uropoda capensis (Marais, 1977)
 Uropoda castrii Hirschmann, 1972
 Uropoda cavernoorbicularis Hiramatsu, 1981
 Uropoda celsocyclosa (Vitzthum, 1926)
 Uropoda chernobaii Wisniewski & Hirschmann, 1992
 Uropoda cienfuegi Wisniewski & Hirschmann, 1993
 Uropoda clara Hiramatsu, 1980
 Uropoda cocuyensis Hirschmann, 1984
 Uropoda complicata (Berlese, 1905)
 Uropoda compta Hiramatsu, 1981
 Uropoda convexifrons Banks, 1916
 Uropoda copridis (Oudemans, 1916)
 Uropoda corbicularis (Womersley, 1961)
 Uropoda crenulata (Marais & Theron, 1986)
 Uropoda crozetensis (Richters, 1907)
 Uropoda cubaensis Hiramatsu, 1980
 Uropoda daelei Hirschmann, 1981
 Uropoda deconincki Hirschmann, 1981
 Uropoda dentifrons Banks, 1916
 Uropoda depilatasimilis Wisniewski, 1979
 Uropoda diengensis Hiramatsu, 1980
 Uropoda diffusa Hiramatsu & Hirschmann, 1979
 Uropoda difoveoiatasimilis Hirschmann, 1972
 Uropoda difoveolata Hirschmann & Zirngiebl-Nicol, 1969
 Uropoda discus Stoll, 1886
 Uropoda disetosa Hirschmann, 1972
 Uropoda distinguenda Berlese, 1903
 Uropoda duplicata Banks, 1916
 Uropoda efferata Hiramatsu, 1981
 Uropoda ehimensis Hiramatsu, 1979
 Uropoda elegans (Marais & Theron, 1986)
 Uropoda erlangensis Hirschmann & Zirngiebl-Nicol, 1969
 Uropoda eustructura Hirschmann, 1972
 Uropoda exilis Hiramatsu & Hirschmann, 1979
 Uropoda fiedleri Wisniewski, 1979
 Uropoda franzi (Marais & Theron, 1986)
 Uropoda fujikawae Hiramatsu, 1978
 Uropoda fumiakii Hiramatsu, 1980
 Uropoda fumicola (Schweizer, 1961)
 Uropoda garciai Hirschmann & Hiramatsu, 1990
 Uropoda gibba Hiramatsu, 1976
 Uropoda goliathi Hirschmann, 1981
 Uropoda granata Hiramatsu & Hirschmann, 1978
 Uropoda grandis Hiramatsu & Hirschmann, 1979
 Uropoda granosa Hiramatsu & Hirschmann, 1978
 Uropoda gressitti Hirschmann, 1972
 Uropoda grolli Wisniewski & Hirschmann, 1992
 Uropoda halberti Hirschmannn, 1993
 Uropoda hallidayi (Athias-Binche & Bloszyk, 1988)
 Uropoda hamulifera Michael, 1894
 Uropoda hamulifera Michael, 1894
 Uropoda heliocopridis (Oudemans, 1901)
 Uropoda hiramatsui Hirschmann, 1976
 Uropoda hiramatsuiformis Hirschmann, 1976
 Uropoda hiramatsuioides Hirschmann, 1976
 Uropoda hiramntsuisimilis Hirschmann, 1976
 Uropoda hirschmanni Hiramatsu, 1977
 Uropoda hispanica Hirschmann & Zirngiebl-Nicol, 1969
 Uropoda hokkaidoensis Hiramatsu, 1979
 Uropoda imadatei Hiramatsu, 1980
 Uropoda indonesiensis Hiramatsu, 1980
 Uropoda inflata (Berlese, 1920)
 Uropoda insulana Hiramatsu, 1979
 Uropoda insulanasimilis Hiramatsu, 1981
 Uropoda integra (Berlese, 1910)
 Uropoda interrupta Hirschmann, 1972
 Uropoda iriomotensis Hiramatsu, 1979
 Uropoda ishikawai Hiramatsu, 1978
 Uropoda italica Hirschmann & Zirngiebl-Nicol, 1969
 Uropoda japanoorbicularis Hiramatsu, 1979
 Uropoda japanorepleta Hiramatsu, 1980
 Uropoda kargi (Hirschmann & Zirngiebl-Nicol, 1969)
 Uropoda kaszabi Hirschmann, 1972
 Uropoda krantzi Hirschmann, 1975
 Uropoda kuchtaorum (F. Athias-Binche & J. Bloszyk, 1988)
 Uropoda kurosai Hiramatsu, 1978
 Uropoda lagena Berlese, 1892
 Uropoda langi Hirschmann, 1981
 Uropoda laqueata Hirschmann, 1972
 Uropoda laqueatasimilis Hiramatsu & Hirschmann, 1979
 Uropoda lauta Hiramatsu & Hirschmann, 1983
 Uropoda lawrencei (Marais, 1977)
 Uropoda leleupi (Marais, 1977)
 Uropoda levidensis Hiramatsu & Hirschmann, 1979
 Uropoda levigata Hiramatsu & Hirschmann, 1978
 Uropoda liffreana Wisniewski & Hirschmann, 1994
 Uropoda lindquisti Hirschmann, 1972
 Uropoda littoralis (Trouessart, 1902)
 Uropoda loksai Hirschmann, 1972
 Uropoda longifrons Banks, 1916
 Uropoda luculenta Hiramatsu & Hirschmann, 1978
 Uropoda luminosa Hiramatsu & Hirschmann, 1983
 Uropoda maeandralis Hirschmann, 1972
 Uropoda mahunkai Hirschmann, 1972
 Uropoda maraisi Hirschmann, 1979
 Uropoda marihirschmanni Hiramatsu, 1977
 Uropoda marítima Hiramatsu, 1977
 Uropoda matskasii Hirschmann, 1981
 Uropoda mediterranea Wisniewski & Hirschmann, 1996
 Uropoda meridiana Hiramatsu & Hirschmann, 1978
 Uropoda michaeliana Leonardi, 1896
 Uropoda micherdzinskii Hirschmann, 1972
 Uropoda mihaili Masan, 1999
 Uropoda minima Kramer, 1882
 Uropoda minor (Berlese, 1885)
 Uropoda minuscula Hutu, 1983
 Uropoda misella (Berlese, 1916)
 Uropoda mitis (Leonardi, 1899)
 Uropoda monserratae Hirschmann, 1984
 Uropoda monstrata Hiramatsu, 1981
 Uropoda montana Hiramatsu, 1979
 Uropoda montivaga Hiramatsu, 1981
 Uropoda morikawai Hiramatsu, 1978
 Uropoda multidentata Hiramatsu, 1981
 Uropoda multipora Hirschmann & Zirngiebl-Nicol, 1969
 Uropoda nahuelbutaensis Hirschmann, 1972
 Uropoda neowoelkei Hiramatsu, 1980
 Uropoda nepalensis Wisniewski & Hirschmann, 1991
 Uropoda neuherzi Hirschmann & Hiramatsu, 1978
 Uropoda nodosa Hirschmann, 1972
 Uropoda novaguinensis Hiramatsu, 1980
 Uropoda obliquifrons Banks, 1916
 Uropoda okumai Hiramatsu, 1980
 Uropoda onishii Hiramatsu, 1980
 Uropoda onishiiorbicularis Hiramatsu, 1980
 Uropoda oraría Hiramatsu, 1977
 Uropoda orbicularis (O.F.Müller, 1776)
 Uropoda orbis (Vitzthum, 1925)
 Uropoda orchestiidarum Barrois, 1887
 Uropoda ornata Hiramatsu & Hirschmann, 1978
 Uropoda orszaghi Masan, 1999
 Uropoda oshimaensis Hiramatsu, 1979
 Uropoda pandata (Michael, 1894)
 Uropoda parva (Schweizer, 1961)
 Uropoda penicillata Hirschmann & Zirngiebl-Nicol, 1969
 Uropoda penicillatasimilis Hirschmann, 1972
 Uropoda permagna Hiramatsu & Hirschmann, 1979
 Uropoda plana Trägårdh, 1908
 Uropoda pocsi Hirschmann, 1981
 Uropoda porticensis (Berlese, 1903)
 Uropoda porticensoides Hirschmann, 1993
 Uropoda porula Hirschmann & Hiramatsu, 1983
 Uropoda potchefstroomensis (Marais & Theron, 1986)
 Uropoda praerupta Hirschmann & Hiramatsu, 1983
 Uropoda procera Hiramatsu & Hirschmann, 1979
 Uropoda procerasimilis Hiramatsu & Hirschmann, 1979
 Uropoda productior Berlese, 1916
 Uropoda pudica Hiramatsu & Hirschmann, 1978
 Uropoda pulchernma (Berlese, 1903)
 Uropoda pulverea Hiramatsu, 1976
 Uropoda pura Hiramatsu & Hirschmann, 1979
 Uropoda quadridentata Hirschmann, 1973
 Uropoda quadridentatasimilis Hiramatsu, 1980
 Uropoda quercifolia Hirschmann, 1972
 Uropoda radiosa Hiramatsu, 1981
 Uropoda rectangula (Kramer, 1898)
 Uropoda regia (Vitzthum, 1921)
 Uropoda regiasimilis Hirschmann, 1972
 Uropoda repleta (Berlese, 1904)
 Uropoda rhynchophori Wisniewski, 1980
 Uropoda richtersi Hirschmann, 1974
 Uropoda ropoda (peritrematalis Hirschmann, 1975)
 Uropoda rotunda Hirschmann, 1972
 Uropoda ruehmi Hirschmann, 1972
 Uropoda sartor Hull, 1918
 Uropoda sasayamaensis Hiramatsu, 1979
 Uropoda saxonica (Willmann, 1955)
 Uropoda schusteri Hirschmann, 1972
 Uropoda scitula Hiramatsu & Hirschmann, 1978
 Uropoda serrata Hirschmann, 1972
 Uropoda serratasimilis Hiramatsu & Hirschmann, 1983
 Uropoda serta Hirschmann, 1972
 Uropoda shanghaica Wisniewski & Hirschmann, 1996
 Uropoda shibai Hiramatsu, 1980
 Uropoda shikokuensis Hiramatsu, 1979
 Uropoda silvatica Hutu, 1976
 Uropoda similiargasiformis Hirschmann, 1981
 Uropoda similibrasiliensis Hirschmann, 1972
 Uropoda similihamulifera Hiramatsu, 1979
 Uropoda similimorikawai Hiramatsu, 1979
 Uropoda similiorbicularis Hiramatsu, 1980
 Uropoda simplex (Berlese, 1903)
 Uropoda simplicior Hirschmann & Zirngiebl-Nicol, 1969
 Uropoda simulans (Berlese, 1905)
 Uropoda singularis Hiramatsu & Hirschmann, 1983
 Uropoda smithi Hirschmann, 1972
 Uropoda solarissima Hirschmann, 1981
 Uropoda spiculata Hirschmann, 1972
 Uropoda spinosissima (Berlese, 1916)
 Uropoda spinosula (Kneissl, 1916)
 Uropoda splendida Kramer, 1882
 Uropoda splendidiformis (Berlese, 1916)
 Uropoda stolida Hiramatsu & Hirschmann, 1978
 Uropoda stolidasimilis Hiramatsu & Hirschmann, 1979
 Uropoda sturmilaqueata Hirschmann, 1984
 Uropoda submarginata Banks, 1916
 Uropoda sumpazae Hirschmann, 1984
 Uropoda tasmanica Banks, 1916
 Uropoda tendiculata Hirschmann, 1972
 Uropoda terrestrisa Hiramatsu & Hirschmann, 1977
 Uropoda tersa Hiramatsu & Hirschmann, 1983
 Uropoda theroni Hirschmann, 1993
 Uropoda topali Hirschmann, 1981
 Uropoda topalisimilis Hiramatsu & Hirschmann, 1983
 Uropoda translucida (Vitzthum, 1921)
 Uropoda trichordis Hiramatsu, 1981
 Uropoda tridentina (G. Canestrini & Fanzago, 1878)
 Uropoda trilobata Banks, 1916
 Uropoda tropicana Hiramatsu, 1978
 Uropoda tropicanasimilis Hiramatsu, 1981
 Uropoda tshushimaensis Hiramatsu, 1980
 Uropoda tumida Hiramatsu, 1981
 Uropoda uncenensis Htramatsu, 1977
 Uropoda undulata Hirschmann & Zirngiebl-Nicol, 1969
 Uropoda vanpletzeni (Marais, 1977)
 Uropoda ventricosa (Berlese, 1904)
 Uropoda verrucosa Hiramatsu, 1980
 Uropoda vietnamensis Hiramatsu, 1981
 Uropoda vitzthumi Hirschmann & Zirngiebl-Nicol, 1969
 Uropoda vulgaris Hirschmann & Zirngtebl-Nicol, 1969
 Uropoda willmanni Hirschmann & Zirngiebl-Nicol, 1969
 Uropoda yakuensis Hiramatsu, 1979
 Uropoda yangambi Hirschmann, 1981
 Uropoda yanoi Hiramatsu, 1979
 Uropoda zicsii Hirschmann, 1972
 Wernerhirschmannia N. Hiramatsu, 1983
 Wernerhirschmannia prima N. Hiramatsu, 1983

References

Uropodidae
Acari families